Fritz Niebler (born 28 August 1958) is a German wrestler. He competed at the 1976 Summer Olympics and the 1984 Summer Olympics.

References

External links
 

1958 births
Living people
German male sport wrestlers
Olympic wrestlers of West Germany
Wrestlers at the 1976 Summer Olympics
Wrestlers at the 1984 Summer Olympics
People from Bergstraße (district)
Sportspeople from Darmstadt (region)